The Optional Protocol to the Convention on the Rights of Persons with Disabilities is a side-agreement to the Convention on the Rights of Persons with Disabilities. It was adopted on 13 December 2006, and entered into force at the same time as its parent Convention on 3 May 2008. As of December 2022, it has 94 signatories and 102 state parties.

The Optional Protocol establishes an individual complaints mechanism for the Convention similar to those of the International Covenant on Civil and Political Rights, Convention on the Elimination of All Forms of Discrimination against Women and Convention on the Elimination of All Forms of Racial Discrimination. But this Protocol also accepts individual rights on economic, social and cultural rights like Optional Protocol to the International Covenant on Economic, Social and Cultural Rights. Parties agree to recognise the competence of the Committee on the Rights of Persons with Disabilities to consider complaints from individuals or groups who claim their rights under the Convention have been violated. The Committee can request information from and make recommendations to a party.

In addition, parties may permit the Committee to investigate, report on and make recommendations on "grave or systematic violations" of the Convention. Parties may opt out of this obligation on signature or ratification.

The Optional Protocol required ten ratifications to come into force.

As of 2015, "[t]he UN Committee on the Rights of Persons with Disabilities is conducting an inquiry into the impact of the UK Government's policies on people with disabilities in relation to their human rights obligations." The Committee has not previously conducted such an inquiry.

See also
 Optional Protocol to the Convention on the Elimination of All Forms of Discrimination against Women
 First Optional Protocol to the International Covenant on Civil and Political Rights
 Disability

References

External links
 Text of the Optional Protocol
 Ratification status
 Committee on the Rights of Persons with Disabilities

Anti-discrimination treaties
United Nations treaties
Optional Protocol to the Convention on the Rights of Persons with Disabilities
Optional Protocol to the Convention on the Rights of Persons with Disabilities
Optional Protocol to the Convention on the Rights of Persons with Disabilities
Treaties of Afghanistan
Treaties of Andorra
Treaties of Angola
Treaties of Argentina
Treaties of Australia
Treaties of Austria
Treaties of Azerbaijan
Treaties of Bangladesh
Treaties of Belgium
Treaties of Benin
Treaties of Bolivia
Treaties of Bosnia and Herzegovina
Treaties of Brazil
Treaties of Burkina Faso
Treaties of Burundi
Treaties of Canada
Treaties of the Central African Republic
Treaties of Chile
Treaties of the Democratic Republic of the Congo
Treaties of the Republic of the Congo
Treaties of the Cook Islands
Treaties of Costa Rica
Treaties of Croatia
Treaties of Cyprus
Treaties of Denmark
Treaties of Djibouti
Treaties of Dominica
Treaties of the Dominican Republic
Treaties of Ecuador
Treaties of El Salvador
Treaties of Estonia
Treaties of Finland
Treaties of France
Treaties of Gabon
Treaties of the Gambia
Treaties of Germany
Treaties of Ghana
Treaties of Greece
Treaties of Guatemala
Treaties of Guinea
Treaties of Guinea-Bissau
Treaties of Haiti
Treaties of Honduras
Treaties of Hungary
Treaties of Italy
Treaties of Latvia
Treaties of Lithuania
Treaties of Luxembourg
Treaties of Mali
Treaties of Malta
Treaties of Mauritania
Treaties of Mexico
Treaties of Moldova
Treaties of Mongolia
Treaties of Montenegro
Treaties of Monaco
Treaties of Morocco
Treaties of Mozambique
Treaties of Namibia
Treaties of Nepal
Treaties of New Zealand
Treaties of Nicaragua
Treaties of Niger
Treaties of Nigeria
Treaties of Palau
Treaties of the State of Palestine
Treaties of Panama
Treaties of Paraguay
Treaties of Peru
Treaties of Portugal
Treaties of Rwanda
Treaties of Saint Lucia
Treaties of San Marino
Treaties of São Tomé and Príncipe
Treaties of Saudi Arabia
Treaties of Slovakia
Treaties of Slovenia
Treaties of Serbia
Treaties of South Africa
Treaties of South Korea
Treaties of Spain
Treaties of Saint Vincent and the Grenadines
Treaties of the Republic of the Sudan (1985–2011)
Treaties of Eswatini
Treaties of Sweden
Treaties of North Macedonia
Treaties of Syria
Treaties of Thailand
Treaties of Togo
Treaties of Tunisia
Treaties of Turkey
Treaties of Turkmenistan
Treaties of Uganda
Treaties of Ukraine
Treaties of the United Kingdom
Treaties of Tanzania
Treaties of Uruguay
Treaties of Venezuela
Treaties of Yemen
Treaties of Zimbabwe
Optional Protocol to the Convention on the Rights of Persons with Disabilities
2006 in New York City
Treaties extended to the Faroe Islands